Shūji Masutani (益谷秀次; 17 January 1888–18 August 1973) was a Japanese jurist and politician who was a member of the Liberal Democratic Party. He served at the House of Representatives for a long time.

Biography
Masutani was a graduate of both the University of Tokyo and Kyoto University. He joined the Liberal Democratic Party in the 1920s. He was part of the factions led by Shigeru Yoshida and then by Hayato Ikeda. Masutani served as the chairman of the executive board of the party between 1950 and 1952. He was elected to the House of Representatives many times. 

Masutani held various posts, including secretary to the president of the board of census, parliamentary vice minister of foreign affairs and construction minister under Prime Minister Shigeru Yoshida. In 1951 he was appointed state minister to the cabinet led by Shigeru Yoshida, but he was soon dropped from the office. Between 1955 and 1958 he served as speaker of the House of Representatives. In the period between 1959 and 1960 he was the deputy prime minister, minister of state and director of the administrative management agency in the cabinet led by Prime Minister Nobusuke Kishi. In 1961 he was appointed chairman of the investigative commission on security. He was in office until 1967 when Naka Funada became the chairman of the commission. 

In October 1972 Masutani retired from politics and died of heart attack in Noto, Ishikawa Prefecture, on 18 August 1983.

References

External links

20th-century Japanese politicians
20th-century jurists
1888 births
1973 deaths
Deputy Prime Ministers of Japan
Japanese jurists
Liberal Democratic Party (Japan) politicians
Members of the House of Representatives (Japan)
Kyoto University alumni
Speakers of the House of Representatives (Japan)
Ministers of Land, Infrastructure, Transport and Tourism of Japan
University of Tokyo alumni